The gray-footed chipmunk (Neotamias canipes) is a species of rodent in the family Sciuridae. It is endemic to New Mexico and in the Sierra Diablo and Guadalupe Mountains in the Trans-Pecos region of Texas in the United States. Its natural habitat is temperate forests.

Habitat
The preferred habitat of the gray-footed chipmunk is down logs at the edge of clearings. They occur also in dense stands of mixed timber (oaks, pines, firs) and on brushy hillsides, particularly where crevices in rocks offer retreats. When alarmed, they usually seek seclusion in crevices or burrows; occasionally they take to the trees.

Diet
Their food consists of a variety of items such as acorns, seeds of Douglas fir, currants, gooseberries, mushrooms, green vegetation, and insects.

Breeding
Little is known of their breeding habits. The young are about half-grown in mid-summer and almost full-grown in September and October, but one female taken in August in the Guadalupe Mountains contained four embryos. One litter a year is normal.

References

Mammals of the United States
Endemic fauna of the United States
Neotamias
Mammals described in 1902
Taxonomy articles created by Polbot